Brickellia paucidentata is a South American species of flowering plants in the family Asteraceae. It is native to Santa Cruz Department in eastern Bolivia.

References

paucidentata
Flora of Bolivia
Plants described in 1881